State Route 239 (SR 239) is a  route that serves as a connection between SR 30 at Clayton with U.S. Route 29 (US 29) in Aberfoil.

Route description
The southern terminus of SR 239 is located at its intersection with SR 30.  It heads north through Clayton where it meets SR 51 and SR 198. From there, the route travels in a westerly direction before making a turn to the northwest near the county line en route to its northern terminus at its intersection with US 29 in Aberfoil, but not before a connecting road to southbound US 29.

Major intersections

References

239
Transportation in Barbour County, Alabama
Transportation in Bullock County, Alabama